Želimir Obradović (born 9 March 1960) is a Serbian professional basketball coach and former professional player who is the head coach for Partizan of the Basketball League of Serbia (KLS), the ABA League and the EuroLeague.

Obradović has won 63 club titles and honours in his entire coaching career, including nine EuroLeague titles with five different clubs, and has also made 18 EuroLeague Final Four appearances, during his coaching career. In addition to his success at the club level, he has also won major trophies as head coach of the senior FR Yugoslavian national team, most notably winning the gold medals at the 1997 EuroBasket and the 1998 FIBA World Championship.

Among his individual coaching awards, he has won two FIBA European Coach of the Year awards, three EuroLeague Coach of the Year awards, four Greek Basket League Best Coach awards, the ABA League Coach of the Season award, two Manager of the Year in Turkey awards, the Best Sports Coach in Greece award and the Ivković Award for Lifetime Achievement. In 2008, he was named one of the 50 Greatest EuroLeague Contributors, making the list as one of the ten head coaches that were chosen. He is considered by many to be the greatest head coach in European history.

Early life
Obradović was born on 9 March 1960, in Čačak, PR Serbia, FPR Yugoslavia.

Playing career

Borac Čačak (1978–1984)
Obradović started his club career as a basketball player with Borac Čačak, in their youth system.

During the 1977–78 season, then eighteen-year-old Obradović, got his first taste of senior men's team basketball at Borac, as he appeared in six Yugoslav First Federal League games during the season, and contributed a total of 3 points. After eventually establishing himself as the team's starting point guard, he stayed with the club until 1984.

Partizan Belgrade (1984–1991)
Over the summer 1984, twenty-four-year-old Obradović joined Partizan. He was brought in by Partizan's incoming head coach Moka Slavnić and vice president Dragan Kićanović, both recent retirees who had starred on the Yugoslav national team throughout the 1970s as a legendary guard duo.

In Obradović's third season with the team, Partizan won the 1986–87 season title of the Yugoslav League. In the following season, they reached the 1987–88 season edition of the European Champions Cup's Final Four. Finally, they won the 1989 Yugoslav Cup and the Korać Cup's championship of the 1988–89 season. During his time at Partizan, Obradović established himself as one of the best and most reliable point guards in Yugoslavia's top-level league.

End of playing career
Obradović's playing career came to a halt when he was sentenced to two years in prison after causing the death of a pedestrian in a car accident. After serving his prison sentence, Obradović returned to the court as a player, and already in his latter days as a player, he began coaching Partizan Belgrade's youth team. He retired from playing basketball in 1991, and he then immediately signed on as head coach of the senior team of the club.

National team career
Obradović was a member of the junior national teams of Yugoslavia. With Yugoslav under-19 national team, he played at the 1979 FIBA Under-19 World Championship.

He was also a member of the senior Yugoslav national team. With Yugoslavia's senior national team, he won a silver medal at the 1988 Summer Olympics, and a gold medal at the 1990 FIBA World Championship.

Coaching career
Obradović's greatness as a professional club basketball coach, is fully confirmed by the great collection of titles he has acquired in his twenty-eight-year career as a head coach, including: a record 9 European-wide premiere level EuroLeague championships (won with five different teams), a record 14 EuroLeague Finals appearances, a record 18 EuroLeague Final Four appearances, two European-wide secondary level Saporta Cup championships, and numerous national domestic league championships and national cups.

Partizan Belgrade (1991–1993)
Obradović's coaching career began quite suddenly in the summer of 1991 while he was still an active thirty-one-year-old Partizan Belgrade player getting ready for EuroBasket 1991 with the Yugoslav national team. Selected and coached by Dušan Ivković, the 1991 national squad was to be captained by Obradović—the oldest player among the assembled group. However, after finishing the training camp in Poreč and coming back to Belgrade to sleep over before leaving in the morning for a preparation friendly tournament in Dortmund, Germany, Obradović got called in for a meeting with the Partizan management—club president Radojica Nikčević, vice-president Dragan Kićanović, as well as board members Đorđe "Siske" Čolović, Milorad "Miketa" Đurić, and Dragan Todorić—who convinced him to take over the Partizan head coaching job, which entailed retiring from playing effective immediately thus giving up a chance to captain the national team at the upcoming EuroBasket.

The idea was to have Obradović, a debutante head coach, work under the guidance of experienced elder statesman of Yugoslav basketball, sixty-seven-year-old professor Aleksandar Nikolić, whose coaching advisory services were soon secured by Kićanović and the club management. Also joining the front office in the technical director capacity was another fresh retiree from playing, thirty-one-year-old Milenko Savović, Obradović's longtime teammate at Partizan, who had spent the previous 1990–91 season playing for Vojvodina.

In the 1991–92 season, Partizan had a 20–2 record in the 1991–92 YUBA League regular season. In the playoffs, they progressed to the final, winning the best-of-five series 3–0 against Crvena zvezda. It also won the Yugoslav Cup in 1992, beating Bosna 105–70 in the final game. In European competition, Obradović led the young squad to become the champions of 1991–92 FIBA European League, on the spur of breakup of Yugoslavia. Partizan played its international matches in Fuenlabrada, Spain, due to international sanctions imposed on FR Yugoslavia.

In 1992–93 season, Partizan was runner-up to Crvena zvezda with 3–2 record in the final series. In 1993 Yugoslav Cup, it lost with 104–91 in the final game to OKK Beograd.

Joventut Badalona (1993–1994)
In 1993, Obradović signed a contract with the Spanish team Joventut, based in Badalona. With Joventut, he won the 1993–94 FIBA European League. In Liga ACB, Joventut finished in 3rd place with 24–14 record. In 1994 Copa del Rey de Baloncesto, Joventut was eliminated in the quarterfinals. However, he won the 1994 Lliga Catalana de Bàsquet.

Real Madrid (1994–1997)
After the end of season, Obradović signed a contract with Real Madrid. In his first season with the club, Real Madrid failed to defend the Liga ACB title, finishing in 3rd place with 27–19 record. In 1995 Copa del Rey de Baloncesto, Real Madrid finished in 4th place. However, he won the 1994–95 FIBA European League.

In 1995–96 season, Real Madrid did not manage to take any title. In Liga ACB, Real Madrid finished in 5th place with 28–12 record. In 1996 Copa del Rey de Baloncesto, Real Madrid finished in 3rd place. On the European scene, Obradović made his third consecutive Final Four appearance and second with Real Madrid, but ended losing in 3rd place game. In 1996–97 season, Real Madrid finished as the runner-up in the Liga ACB and was also eliminated in the quarterfinals of the 1997 Copa del Rey de Baloncesto. In European competitions, Real Madrid participated in second-tier FIBA Saporta Cup and eventually won it with 78–64 in the final game over Verona. At the end of the season, Obradović parted ways with the team.

Benetton Treviso (1997–1999)
In the summer of 1997, in-demand Obradović, who had just won EuroBasket 1997 as FR Yugoslavia's head coach, made a high profile club move, signing with the Italian league champions Benetton Treviso thus succeeding Mike D'Antoni who had taken an offer from the NBA to join the Denver Nuggets' coaching staff as an assistant. Acquired on initiative by the club's general manager Maurizio Gherardini, reportedly despite some initial apprehension on the part of the Benetton Group CEO Luciano Benetton, the three-time-Euroleague-winning coach Obradović took over the squad led by the center Željko Rebrača (whom the coach already knew well having coached him in Partizan and Yugoslavia national team to great success) and shooting guard Henry Williams.

In 1997–98 season, Treviso was eliminated in the quarterfinal series of the Serie A1 playoffs with 3–2 record by Reggio Emilia. In 1997–98 FIBA EuroLeague, Treviso finished in 3rd place after 96–89 win over Partizan Belgrade in the Final Four.

In 1998–99 season, Treviso finished as the runner-up in the Serie A1 playoffs, after 3–0 record in the final series against Varese. Also, Treviso won the FIBA Saporta Cup, following 64–60 win in the final game over Valencia.

Panathinaikos (1999–2012)

In the summer of 1999, Obradović became head coach of Panathinaikos. In his first season with the club, he won the 1999–2000 Greek Basket League with 3–0 record in the final series against PAOK Thessaloniki. In 2000 Greek Cup final, it lost with 59–57 by AEK Athens. Also, Panathinaikos won the 1999–2000 FIBA EuroLeague, after 73–67 win in the final game over Maccabi Tel Aviv. It was club's second EuroLeague championship in history.

Obradović stayed with Panathinaikos until 2012, leading the team to become the top club in European club basketball during that time, while simultaneously maintaining the club at the top position in the Greek national championship. In total, Obradović won with Panathinaikos eleven Greek League championships, seven Greek Cups and five EuroLeague titles (2000, 2002, 2007, 2009, and 2011).

In 2007, he achieved winning the highly coveted Triple Crown championship, for the second time as a head coach (the first was in 1992 with Partizan), and won the EuroLeague Coach of the Year award. Also in 2009, in Berlin, he completed this achievement as head coach for the third time. In 2011, he won his 8th EuroLeague trophy overall, and 5th with Panathinaikos.

Despite winning the Greek Cup in the 2011–12 season, Panathinaikos finished 4th in the 2011–12 season of the EuroLeague, while Olympiacos was crowned the EuroLeague champion. Following this disappointment, Panathinaikos lost to Olympiacos, 3 games to 2, in a best-of-five Greek League Finals series. After that, in June 2012, Obradović announced that he was stepping down as head coach of Panathinaikos, after 13 consecutive seasons.

Fenerbahçe (2013–2020)

In early July 2013, Obradović signed a two-year contract with the Turkish club Fenerbahçe, that was reportedly worth €3 million in net income salary, over the contract period. After inheriting a roster with point guard Bo McCalebb and versatile shooting guards / small forwards Bojan Bogdanović and Emir Preldžić, the famous head coach added a pair of marquee forwards, in Linas Kleiza and Nemanja Bjelica. He additionally signed Luka Žorić and Melih Mahmutoğlu, as well as talented youngsters Ömer Yurtseven and Kenan Sipahi.

In his first season with the club, Obradović won the Turkish League championship, following a 4–3 record in the league's finals series against Galatasaray. In the 2014 Turkish Cup, Fenerbahçe were eliminated in the semifinals by Pınar Karşıyaka. In the 2013–14 EuroLeague season, they reached the Top 16 stage.

In the 2014–15 season, Fenerbahçe finished the regular season of the Turkish League in first place, with a 23–7 record. In the Turkish League Playoffs, they were eliminated in the semifinals series by Karşıyaka Basket, with a 3–1 record. They were also runners-up in the 2015 Turkish Cup. In the 2014–15 EuroLeague season, Fenerbahçe reached the 2015 Euroleague Final Four, where they were eliminated in the semifinals, and later lost in the 3rd place game. The appearance in the EuroLeague Final Four was the first in the club's long history. On 25 May 2015, after the end of season, he signed a two-year extension with Fenerbahçe.

In the 2015–16 season, Fenerbahçe finished in second place in the Turkish Super League regular season, with a 24–6 record. In the Turkish Super League Playoffs, Fenerbahçe went on to win the league championship, with a 4–2 record in the finals series against Anadolu Efes. The club also won the 2016 Turkish Cup. In the 2015–16 EuroLeague season, they finished as runners-up, after losing against CSKA Moscow in the final game of the 2016 Final Four.

On 18 November 2016, Ozan Balaban, a board member of Fenerbahçe SK, declared at the QNB Finansbank sponsorship ceremony of the club, that Obradović would sign a new three-year deal with the club. On 3 December 2016, Obradović officially extended his contract with the club, until the end of the 2019–20 season.

In the 2016–17 season, Fenerbahçe finished with a 28–2 record in the Turkish Super League regular season, and eventually won the league championship, after a 4–0 record in the finals series over rivals Beşiktaş. On 21 May 2017, Fenerbahçe won the EuroLeague championship finals game against Olympiacos, which was the first EuroLeague championship in the club's history, and also the first for any Turkish team. In the summer of 2017, two of the team's core players, Bogdan Bogdanović and Ekpe Udoh, left the team and moved to the NBA.

In the 2017–18 season, Fenerbahçe once again finished the Turkish Super League regular season in first place, with a dominant 27–3 record. In the 2018 Turkish Cup, Fenerbahçe were eliminated early in the quarterfinals, by the eventual cup winners, Anadolu Efes. In the 2017–18 EuroLeague season, Fenerbahçe made it to the 2018 EuroLeague Final Four, their fourth consecutive Final Four appearance. Eventually, they lost to Real Madrid, by a score of 80–85, in the final game. At the end of the season, Fenerbahçe won its third consecutive Turkish Super League title, after winning the league's finals series 4–1 against Tofaş.

In the 2018–19 season, Fenerbahçe lost to Efes in the Turkish Presidential Cup final, and later beat Efes in the 2019 Turkish Cup final. They also lost to Efes in the Turkish Super League playoff's finals series, 4–3. In the 2018–19 EuroLeague season, the club made its fifth straight EuroLeague Final Four appearance, as they qualified to the 2019 EuroLeague Final Four, where they finished in fourth place.

In the 2019–20 season, Fenerbahçe had underwhelming results as they were in the bottom and the middle of 2019–20 EuroLeague Regular Season standings from the beginning of the season until the season cancellation in May 2020 due to the COVID-19 pandemic. After 28 rounds, they had 13–15 record and were holding 8th place which would lead them to quarterfinals. In 2019–20 Basketbol Süper Ligi which was also cancelled in May for the same reason, Fenerbahçe was in fourth place with 17–5 record and one game behind the worse-record Galatasaray.

On 23 June 2020, Fenerbahçe announced that Obradović would no longer be the head coach since he wants to take a break from coaching for one year.

Return to Partizan Belgrade (2021–present)
On 25 June 2021, Obradović signed a three-year contract with Partizan Belgrade, returning to his former club after 28 years. In the 2021–22 EuroCup, Partizan was eliminated in eighfinals by Bursaspor at home court, which was considered a failure as one of the season goals was to run deep into the competition. In the 2021–22 ABA League, Partizan improved their regular season record over last season by 9 wins, having 22–4 record. In April 2022, Obradović was named the ABA League Coach of the Season for 2021–22 regular season performances.

National team coaching career
Previously an assistant coach to Dušan Ivković (1992–1995), Obradović worked as head coach of the senior FR Yugoslavia national team (1996–2000). With FR Yugoslavia, he won a silver medal at the 1996 Summer Olympics, a gold medal at the 1997 EuroBasket, a gold medal at the 1998 FIBA World Championship, and a bronze medal at the 1999 EuroBasket. He was also the Serbia and Montenegro national team head coach (2004–2005).

Coaching style
Well known for his temperamental approach, Obradović also has a reputation for being adaptable with his ability to course correct on the fly underscored by a number of coaches. 

He often utilized a system heavy on pick-and-rolls, focusing on using the corners and back passes to open up the offense and make it more difficult for the defense to commit. With Panathinaikos, from 2004 onward, he made center Mike Batiste and point guard Dimitris Diamantidis the focal points of this pick-and-roll setup. In the process, Obradović moved both players from their traditional positions—Diamantidis from shooting guard to point guard and undersized combo forward Batiste to center—thereby implementing one of the first small ball setups in professional basketball to yield great results.

Revered San Antonio Spurs head coach Gregg Popovich has been a longtime admirer of Obradović's coaching style, frequently praising him and admitting to "stealing his plays". In turn, Obradović, ahead of his second season coaching Fenerbahce, talked about spending a significant portion of the summer 2014 off-season, dissecting the San Antonio game, particularly positioning and ball movement, with a view of implementing it into his team.

Coaching record

EuroLeague

|- 
| align="left" rowspan=2|Partizan
|- ! style="background:#FDE910;"
| align="left"|1991–92
| 21 || 15 || 6 ||  || align="center"|Won EuroLeague Championship
|- 
| align="left" rowspan=2|Joventut
|- ! style="background:#FDE910;"
| "align="left"|1993–94
| 20 || 15 || 5 ||  || align="center"|Won EuroLeague Championship
|- 
| align="left" rowspan=3|Real Madrid
|- ! style="background:#FDE910;"
| align="left"|1994–95
| 18 || 13 || 5 ||  || align="center"|Won EuroLeague Championship
|- 
| align="left" |1995–96
| 19 || 11 || 8 ||  || align="center"|Lost in 3rd place game
|- 
| align="left"|Benetton
| align="left"|1997–98
| 23 || 17 || 6 ||  || align="center"|Won in 3rd place game
|- 
| align="left" rowspan=14|Panathinaikos
|- ! style="background:#FDE910;"
| align="left"|1999–00
| 23 || 19 || 4 ||  || align="center"|Won EuroLeague Championship
|- 
| align="left"|2000–01
| 24 || 18 || 6 ||  || align="center"|Lost in the final game
|- ! style="background:#FDE910;"
| align="left"|2001–02
| 22 || 19 || 3 ||  || align="center"|Won EuroLeague Championship
|- 
| align="left"|2002–03
| 20 || 14 || 6 ||  || align="center"|Eliminated in Top 16 stage
|- 
| align="left"|2003–04
| 20 || 9 || 11 ||  || align="center"|Eliminated in Top 16 stage
|- 
| align="left"|2004–05
| 25 || 15 || 10 ||  || align="center"|Won in 3rd place game
|- 
| align="left"|2005–06
| 23 || 16 || 7 ||  || align="center"|Lost in Quarterfinal Playoffs
|- ! style="background:#FDE910;"
| align="left"|2006–07
| 24 || 20 || 4 ||  || align="center"|Won EuroLeague Championship
|- 
| align="left"|2007–08
| 20 || 15 || 5 ||  || align="center"|Eliminated in Top 16 stage
|- ! style="background:#FDE910;"
| align="left"|2008–09
| 22 || 17 || 5 ||  || align="center"|Won EuroLeague Championship
|- 
| align="left"|2009–10
| 16 || 10 || 6 ||  || align="center"|Eliminated in Top 16 stage
|- ! style="background:#FDE910;"
| align="left"|2010–11
| 22 || 16 || 6 ||  || align="center"|Won EuroLeague Championship
|- 
| align="left"|2011–12
| 23 || 14 || 9 ||  || align="center"|Lost in 3rd place game
|- 
| align="left" rowspan=7|Fenerbahçe
| align="left"|2013–14
| 24 || 14 || 10 ||  || align="center"|Eliminated in Top 16 stage
|- 
| align="left"|2014–15
| 29 || 22 || 7 ||  || align="center"|Lost in 3rd place game
|- 
| align="left"|2015–16
| 29 || 23 || 6 ||  || align="center"|Lost in the final game
|- ! style="background:#FDE910;"
| align="left"|2016–17
| 35 || 23 || 12 ||  || align="center"|Won EuroLeague Championship
|- 
| align="left"|2017–18
| 36 || 25 || 11 ||  || align="center"|Lost in the final game
|- 
| align="left"|2018–19
| 32 || 25 || 7 ||  || align="center"|Lost in 3rd place game
|- 
| align="left"|2019–20
| 28 || 13 || 15 ||  || align="center"|Season cancelled
|-class="sortbottom"
| align="center" colspan=2|Career||598||418||180||||

Domestic leagues

|-
| align="left" |Panathinaikos
| align="left" |2001–02
|28||21||7||.750 || align="center"| Lost in Semifinals round
|- ! style="background:#FDE910;"
| align="left" |Panathinaikos
| align="left" |2002–03
|35||28||7||.800 || align="center"| Won 2003 Greek Basket League Finals
|- ! style="background:#FDE910;"
| align="left" |Panathinaikos
| align="left" |2003–04
|34||29||5||.853 || align="center"| Won 2004 Greek Basket League Finals
|- ! style="background:#FDE910;"
| align="left" |Panathinaikos
| align="left" |2004–05
|37||30||7||.811 || align="center"| Won 2005 Greek Basket League Finals
|- ! style="background:#FDE910;"
| align="left" |Panathinaikos
| align="left" |2005–06
|34||32||2||.941 || align="center"| Won 2006 Greek Basket League Finals
|- ! style="background:#FDE910;"
| align="left" |Panathinaikos
| align="left" |2006–07
|36||32||4||.889 || align="center"| Won 2007 Greek Basket League Finals
|- ! style="background:#FDE910;"
| align="left" |Panathinaikos
| align="left" |2007–08
|36||31||5||.861 || align="center"| Won 2008 Greek Basket League Finals
|- ! style="background:#FDE910;"
| align="left" |Panathinaikos
| align="left" |2008–09
|35||30||5||.857 || align="center"| Won 2009 Greek Basket League Finals
|- ! style="background:#FDE910;"
| align="left" |Panathinaikos
| align="left" |2009–10
|35||33||2||.943 || align="center"| Won 2010 Greek Basket League Finals
|- ! style="background:#FDE910;"
| align="left" |Panathinaikos
| align="left" |2010–11
|35||32||3||.914 || align="center"| Won 2011 Greek Basket League Finals
|-
| align="left" |Panathinaikos
| align="left" |2011–12
|35||29||6||.829 || align="center"| Lost 2012 Greek Basket League Finals
|- ! style="background:#FDE910;"
| align="left" |Fenerbahçe Beko
| align="left" |2013–14
|42||33||9||.786 || align="center"| Won 2014 Turkish League Finals
|-
| align="left" |Fenerbahçe Beko
| align="left" |2014–15
|37||26||11||.703 || align="center"| Lost in Semifinals round
|- ! style="background:#FDE910;"
| align="left" |Fenerbahçe Beko
| align="left" |2015–16
|42||33||9||.786 || align="center"| Won 2016 Turkish League Finals
|-
|- ! style="background:#FDE910;"
| align="left" |Fenerbahçe Beko
| align="left" |2016–17
|39||37||2||.949 || align="center"| Won 2017 Turkish League Finals
|-
|- ! style="background:#FDE910;"
| align="left" |Fenerbahçe Beko
| align="left" |2017–18
|40||36||4||.900 || align="center"| Won 2018 Turkish League Finals
|-
| align="left" |Fenerbahçe Beko
| align="left" |2018–19
|41||33||8||.805 || align="center"| Lost 2019 Turkish League Finals
|-
| align="left" |Fenerbahçe Beko
| align="left" |2019–20
|22||17||5||.773 || align="center"| Season cancelled
|-class="sortbottom"
| align="center" colspan=2|Career||643|||542|||101||.843||

Playing achievements

 FIBA Korać Cup champion: 1 (with Partizan: 1988–89)
 Yugoslav League champion: 1 (with Partizan: 1986–87)
 Yugoslav Cup winner: 1 (with Partizan: 1988–89)
 EuroLeague 3rd place: 1 (with Partizan: 1987–88)
Yugoslavia national team: 
1988 Summer Olympic Games: 
1990 FIBA World Championship:

Coaching achievements

Multiple titles
 European Cups (11×):
 EuroLeague champion: 9 (with Partizan: 1991–92, Joventut Badalona: 1993–94, Real Madrid: 1994–95, Panathinaikos: 1999–00, 2001–02, 2006–07, 2008–09, 2010–11 and Fenerbahçe: 2016–17)
 FIBA Saporta Cup winner: 2 (with Real Madrid: 1996–97 and Benetton Treviso: 1998–99)

 National Championships (16×):
Greek League champion: 11 (with Panathinaikos: 1999–00, 2000–01, 2002–03, 2003–04, 2004–05, 2005–06, 2006–07, 2007–08, 2008–09, 2009–10, 2010–11)
 Turkish League champion: 4 (with Fenerbahçe: 2013–14, 2015–16, 2016–17, 2017–18)
 Yugoslav League champion: 1 (with Partizan: 1991–92)

 National Cups (11×):
 Greek Cup winner: 7 (with Panathinaikos: 2002–03, 2004–05, 2005–06, 2006–07, 2007–08, 2008–09, 2011–12)
 Turkish Cup winner: 3 (with Fenerbahçe: 2016, 2019, 2020)
 Yugoslav Cup winner: 1 (with Partizan: 1991–92)
 National Super Cups (4×):
 Turkish Super Cup winner: 3 (with Fenerbahçe: 2013, 2016, 2017)
 Italian Super Cup winner: 1 (with Benetton Treviso: 1997)
 EuroLeague Final Four without winning (9×):
 2nd place: 3 (with Panathinaikos: 2000–01 and Fenerbahçe: 2015–16, 2017–18)
 3rd place: 2 (with Benetton Treviso: 1997–98 and Panathinaikos: 2004–05)
 4th place: 4 (with Real Madrid: 1995–96, Panathinaikos: 2011–12 and Fenerbahçe: 2014–15, 2018–19)

Titles by club

Partizan (1991–1993)
EuroLeague champion: (1992) 
Yugoslav League champion: (1992)
Yugoslav Cup winner: (1992)

Joventut Badalona (1993–1994)
EuroLeague champion: (1994)
Lliga Catalana de Bàsquet champion: (1994)

Real Madrid (1994–1997)
EuroLeague champion: (1995)
FIBA Saporta Cup champion: (1997)

Benetton Treviso (1997–1999)
FIBA Saporta Cup champion: (1999)
Italian Super Cup winner: (1997)

Panathinaikos (1999–2012)
5× EuroLeague champion: (2000, 2002, 2007, 2009, 2011)
11× Greek League champion: (2000, 2001, 2003, 2004, 2005, 2005–06, 2006–07, 2007–08, 2008–09, 2009–10, 2010–11)
7× Greek Cup winner: (2003, 2005, 2006, 2007, 2008, 2009, 2012)

Fenerbahçe (2013–2020)
EuroLeague champion: (2017) 
4× Turkish League champion: (2013–14, 2015–16, 2016–17, 2017–18)
3× Turkish Cup winner: (2016, 2019, 2020)
3× Turkish Super Cup winner: (2013, 2016, 2017)

FR Yugoslavia/Serbia and Montenegro National Team (1992–2000, 2004–2005)
Assistant coach
EuroBasket 1995: 
Head coach
1996 Summer Olympics: 
EuroBasket 1997: 
1998 FIBA World Championship: 
EuroBasket 1999:

Individual
2x FIBA European Coach of the Year: (1994, 1995)
3x EuroLeague Coach of the Year: (2007, 2011, 2017)
4x Greek League Best Coach: (2000, 2007, 2009, 2011) 
ABA League Coach of the Season: (2022)
2x Manager of the Year in Turkey: (2017, 2018)
Best Sports Coach in Greece: (2009)
Ivković Award for Lifetime Achievement: (1999)
50 Greatest EuroLeague Contributors: (2008)

See also
 List of Olympic medalists in basketball
 List of EuroLeague-winning head coaches
 List of FIBA EuroBasket winning head coaches
 FIBA Basketball World Cup winning head coaches

References

External links

 Željko Obradović at fiba.com
 Željko Obradović at paobc.gr
 Željko Obradović at euroleague.net
 Interview – Željko Obradović; Nedeljnik 2017, (in Serbian)
 Interview – Željko Obradović; Vreme, 12 February 2004 
 The top of the Greek bench: Željko Obradović at esake.gr 
 Zeljko Obradovic – More than a coach – Euroleague Documentary Series

1960 births
Living people
1990 FIBA World Championship players
20th-century Serbian people
Basketball players at the 1988 Summer Olympics
Basketball players from Čačak
Basketbol Süper Ligi head coaches
EuroLeague-winning coaches
Fenerbahçe basketball coaches
FIBA EuroBasket-winning coaches
FIBA World Championship-winning players
Joventut Badalona coaches
KK Borac Čačak players
KK Partizan coaches
KK Partizan players
Liga ACB head coaches
Medalists at the 1988 Summer Olympics
Medalists at the 1996 Summer Olympics
Olympic basketball players of Yugoslavia
Olympic medalists in basketball
Olympic silver medalists for Yugoslavia
Pallacanestro Treviso coaches
Panathinaikos B.C. coaches
People from Čačak
Point guards
Real Madrid basketball coaches
Serbia and Montenegro national basketball team coaches
Serbian men's basketball coaches
Serbian expatriate basketball people in Greece
Serbian expatriate basketball people in Italy
Serbian expatriate basketball people in Spain
Serbian expatriate basketball people in Turkey
Serbian men's basketball players
Yugoslav basketball coaches
Yugoslav men's basketball players